Reniform is an adjective meaning "kidney-shaped" and may specifically refer to:
 Reniform habit, a type of crystal shape
 Reniform leaf, a plant leaf shape
 Reniform seed, a plant seed shape
 Reniform stigma, a spot on the wings of certain moths

See also 
 Runiform (disambiguation)